Pholus may refer to:
 5145 Pholus, a minor planet in the Solar System
 Pholus (mythology), a centaur in Greek myth